Rubén Tierrablanca González (24 August 1952 – 22 December 2020) was a Mexican-born Turkish Catholic bishop.

Biography
Tierrablanca González was born in Mexico and was ordained to the priesthood in 1978. He served as titular bishop of Tubernuca and as Vicar Apostolic of Apostolic Vicariate of Istanbul and Apostolic Administrator of Greek Catholic Apostolic Exarchate of Istanbul, from 2016 until his death in office in 2020.

He died in Istanbul at age 68, from COVID-19 during the COVID-19 pandemic in Turkey, after being hospitalized for three weeks in intensive care.

References

1952 births
2020 deaths
Mexican expatriates in Turkey
Mexican Roman Catholic priests
Turkish Roman Catholic bishops
Deaths from the COVID-19 pandemic in Turkey
Eastern Catholic bishops in Turkey